Quena may refer to:

 Quena, the flute-like musical instrument
 The telenovela director María Eugenia Rencoret
 The common name of the plant Solanum esuriale

Not to be confused with:

 Qena, a city in Egypt